Kowalów may refer to the following places in Poland:
Kowalów, Lower Silesian Voivodeship (south-west Poland)
Kowalów, Lubusz Voivodeship (west Poland)